End of Active Service (EAS) is the conclusion of the period of active duty commitment for a member of the U.S. Army, U.S. Marine Corps or the U.S. Air Force.  The equivalent term used by the U.S Navy, and U.S. Coast Guard is the End of Active Obligated Service (EAOS). 

This date can be changed by reenlistment, extension, retirement, renewal of active orders, and administrative separation, among other things. This is not to be confused with Expiration of Current Contract (ECC) or Expiration of Obligated Service (EOS).

References

Military life